Nik Ingersoll (Ingersöll) (born Nicholas Ingersoll on November 18, 1987) is an American entrepreneur and designer best known as Co-Founder and Chief Marketing Officer of Barnana. He was born and raised in Scottsbluff, Nebraska. He has founded several other companies, including the augmented-reality company Candy Lab, and was named in the Forbes 30 Under 30 list in 2016.

Barnana 
Nik co-founded Barnana, an organic natural foods brand along with Caue Suplicy and Matt Clifford in 2012, where he has served as the chief marketing officer. The company aims to adopt sustainability along all verticals and is a Certified B Corp.

Recognition 
In 2014, Ingersoll was named one of the Top Entrepreneurs To Watch by Food Navigator. In 2018, Ingersoll won a GDUSA Design Award, A’ Design Award, and an iF International Design Forum Award.

References

External links 
https://barnana.com/
https://ingersollnik.com/
http://candylab.com/

1987 births
Living people
American company founders